Events from the year 1679 in Ireland.

Incumbent
Monarch: Charles II

Events
 Lismore Cathedral (Church of Ireland) abandoned until 1749.

Births
September 11 – Thomas Parnell, clergyman and poet (d.1718)
Anthony Duane, businessman in America (d.1747)

Deaths
Sir George Hamilton, 1st Baronet of Donalong, soldier.

References

 
1670s in Ireland
Ireland
Years of the 17th century in Ireland